Brentwood Park is a  public park in Portland, Oregon's Brentwood-Darlington neighborhood, in the United States. The park was acquired in 1951.

References

External links

 

1951 establishments in Oregon
Brentwood-Darlington, Portland, Oregon
Protected areas established in 1951